Qeshlaq-e Bala (also Romanized as Qeshlāq-e Bālā and Qeshlāq Bālā; also known as Keshlak-Yukhari, Qeshlāq ‘Olyā, Qeshlāq Yūkhārī, and Qishlāq Yukāri) is a village in Mavazekhan-e Shomali Rural District, Khvajeh District, Heris County, East Azerbaijan Province, Iran. At the 2006 census, its population was 142, in 30 families.

References 

Populated places in Heris County